The Union of Latin American Parties is an alliance of centre-right and right-wing political parties in Latin America and Canada. It is affiliated with the global International Democrat Union.

UPLA has twenty-two member parties (including observers and an associate) in eighteen of the region's twenty-one countries.

Principles
"Cochabamba, Bolivia. November 22, 1992.

The Political Parties and Movements of Latin America, implementing the agreements reached at the meetings in Guatemala and Santiago, resolved at the Meeting in Cochabamba, the creation of the Union of Latin American Parties U.P.L.A.  and adopt the following Declaration of Principles:

We recognize the superior dignity of the person, in his freedom and in his transcendent destiny.

The members of the Union of Latin American Parties adhere to Democracy as a form of political organization and the Social Market Economy as an instrument that produces wealth, development and well-being of the peoples.

We affirm that a true democracy requires a commitment that we share, expanding people's freedom, lowering power, and seeking a more humane and supportive society.

We promote the real participation of citizens in decisions, the free development of different political options and the recognition of minorities.

We maintain that the State must be at the service of people and the common good, concentrating its function in the sphere of its competence and in that determined by its subsidiary action, while private initiative must constitute the main engine of economic activity and  that solidarity offers everyone an effective equality of opportunities.

We believe that the human person is the foundation of all social order. For this reason, purely economic development is not enough, since it must have a human content that generates a social environment where men and women enjoy a long, healthy and creative life;  where they enjoy personal security together with their families and have access to a greater culture, and the information necessary for its comprehensive fulfillment.

Consider that it is a priority to guarantee an equal effectiveness of opportunities, all without exception, so that they are successful from their origin and resources, have access to the basic means that allow them to carry out achievements fully. Therefore, we affirm as an ethical imperative, the overcoming of all forms of marginality that affects an obstacle to the development and expression of the potential of each person.

We proclaim that the family is the main socializing agent, whose cohesion constitutes the integrating force of society. For this reason, we value its transcendental function as a social force, carrier and transmitter of the historical and cultural identity of peoples, as well as the values on which effective human development is based.

Conscious of the growing process of globalization of international relations and of the imperative to participate in this process, we affirm the will to work for Latin American integration, as a fundamental objective, to respond to the political, economic and social challenges that affect our peoples and  facilities through it, its integration with the world.

The UPLA has seen a series of problems that affect Latin America and that emerge as a catalog of questions regarding the validity of democracy in the region and, therefore, your concern may be a priority concern in its work program, among these the following have been highlighted: corruption, drug trafficking, and drug addiction; the urban and rural guerrillas; terrorism, marginalization and poverty; human ecology, the modernization of the political structures of the State and economic management; Latin American education and participation in the emerging non-national order.

The adherence of all the members of all the Latin American Parties to the main statements and the will to work to overcome the aforementioned problems, represents the contribution we make so that Latin America becomes a protagonist in the face of the challenges of the 21st century."

Ideology
The organization is committed to promoting and defending liberty, democracy and the rule of law in the region.  It seeks to strengthen the regional presence of the International Democratic Union (IDU) on the American continent and to promote and defend the ideas and values of said organization.

Member parties

Associate parties

References

External links
  Union of Latin American Parties official website

International Democrat Union